Woman of Fire is a 1971 South Korean film directed by Kim Ki-young. This was the second film in Kim's Housemaid trilogy followed by Woman of Fire '82. The film is a remake of the classical The Housemaid.

Plot
The lives of a composer and his wife, who live on a chicken farm, are thrown into turmoil when a femme fatale joins their household.

Release
Woman of Fire was rescreened in South Korean cinemas on May 1, 2021.

Cast
Namkoong Won as Dong-shik
Jeon Gye-hyeon as Jeong-suk
Youn Yuh-jung as Myeong-ja
Choi Moo-ryong as Detective
Kim Ju-mi-hye
O Yeong-a as Hye-ok
Hwang Baek
Chu Seok-yang as Ki-ja
Lee Hoon 
Lee Ji-yeon

Awards
Festival de Cine de Sitges
Special Mention Best Actress (Youn Yuh-jung)
Blue Dragon Film Awards
Best Director (Kim Ki-young)

Notes

Bibliography

External links

Maids in films
1970s Korean-language films
Films directed by Kim Ki-young
South Korean romantic thriller films
South Korean erotic films
Remakes of South Korean films